Dil Dil Pakistan is the most popular patriotic Pakistani song, sung by Junaid Jamshed. It was released in 1987 by the pop band Vital Signs. The song was featured in the band's debut album, Vital Signs 1, in 1987. Dil Dil Pakistan is said to be the Pakistan's second national anthem.

Reception
"Dil Dil Pakistan" has been hailed as an unofficial national anthem of Pakistan.

In a 2003 BBC World Service online poll of popular songs, "Dil Dil Pakistan" came third.

Music video
The official music video was filmed in Islamabad, the capital of Pakistan. The filming locations in Islamabad were: Islamabad Golf Club, Shakarparian, and Constitution Avenue.

In the video, the band members are playing musical instruments in open fields, as well as riding bikes and driving a Jeep around the city and highlighting the most picturesque, hilly areas. In one scene, the group performs by the slope of a small hill with "I love Pakistan" painted in large lettering on a boulder. Toward the end of the video, the band plays in a small studio with a simple green backdrop and bright lights. The song has synthesizers, keyboards, major chord progression, and a catchy chorus hook.

Influence
This song is speculated to have been influenced by the works of the renowned poet of British India and founding father of Pakistan, Mohammad Iqbal.

References

External links 
 Cherishing Independence from afar - Dawn (newspaper)
 MP3 and Song Lyrics in Urdu

1987 songs
Songs about Pakistan
Urdu-language songs
Pakistani patriotic songs